Carl William Roth (September 15, 1909 – May 28, 1966) was an American basketball player and coach. A native of Sheboygan, Wisconsin, Roth attended the University of Wisconsin–Madison and played for their men's basketball team from 1929 to 1932. Six years later he played in 14 total games for the Sheboygan Red Skins during the 1938–39 season. The Red Skins were a professional franchise that competed in the National Basketball League (NBL).

Roth stayed with the team as both its legal counsel and in other capacities after his one-season playing. He took over as head coach in 1942 and coached for two seasons. In his first year, the Red Skins won the league championship and he was named the NBL Coach of the Year. He died after a short illness in 1966 at a Peoria, Illinois hospital.

References

1909 births
1966 deaths
American men's basketball players
Basketball coaches from Wisconsin
Basketball players from Wisconsin
Forwards (basketball)
Guards (basketball)
Sheboygan Red Skins coaches
Sheboygan Red Skins players
Sportspeople from Sheboygan, Wisconsin
Wisconsin Badgers men's basketball players